USS PGM-32 was a  in service with the United States Navy during the end of World War II, and briefly post-war.

History
PGM-32 was laid down on 14 August 1944, as PC-1568 by the Leathem D. Smith Shipbuilding Co. Two days later on 16 August, she was reclassified as Motor Gunboat, and renamed PGM-32. On 14 October 1944, she was launched, and was commissioned on 9 February 1945.

In 1946, she participated in Operation Crossroads, the U.S. nuclear testing at Bikini Atoll. PGM-32 would survive the blasts.

Ship's fate
PGM-32 was transferred to the State Department, Foreign Liquidation Commission on 27 October 1947 and subsequently sold. Her fate is unknown.

References

External links
NavSource- U.S.S. PGM-32
Hyperwar, PGM-32

1944 ships
Ships of the United States Navy
Ships built in Sturgeon Bay, Wisconsin
World War II gunboats of the United States
PGM-9-class motor gunboats